Drongpa County
or Zhongba County
() is a county of Shigatse Prefecture in China's Tibet Autonomous Region. Located in the western part of Central Tibet (sometimes referred to as "western Tibet"), it is the birthplace of the Tsangpo River (Brahmaputra). The county seat is at Labrang, which is also called the Drongpa Town (Zhongba Xian).

Geography 
Drongpa County is the largest county in the Shigatse Prefecture by geographical area. It has a population of approximately 18,000 and covers 43,594 square kilometers. It is prone to earthquakes and suffered a large one, 6.8 on the Richter scale, on 30 August 2008. The county is dotted with lakes such as Taruo Lake, Ang Laren Lake and Renqingxiubu Lake.

Drongpa County shares the Tibet Autonomous Region's southern border with most of western Nepal's  Karnali and Dhaulagiri  Zones with a  border crossing into Mustang  District leading through the former Lo Kingdom to its historic capital Lo Manthang.

Maps

Town and townships

 Baryang Town
 Labrang Township
 Bodoi Township
 Gêla Township
 Gyêma Township
 Horpa Township
 Lunggar Township
 Nagqu Township
 Penchi Township
 Barma Township
 Qonkor Township
 Rintor Township
 Yagra Township

Transport 
China National Highway 219

Footnotes

Bibliography
 

Counties of Tibet
Shigatse
China–Nepal border crossings